Samuel Lahm (April 22, 1812 – June 16, 1876) was a lawyer, politician, and  U.S. Representative from Ohio for one term from 1847 to 1849.

Early life and career 
He was the father of Frank Samuel Lahm, a noted expatriate and pioneer balloonist, and the grandfather of Brigadier General Frank Purdy Lahm, aerial pioneer, student of the Wright brothers, and the first military officer to fly an airplane. He married Almira Brown of New Hampshire and was related by marriage to Daniel Webster. The couple had five children: Marshall, Edward, Frank Samuel, Charles Henry, and Helen Rebecca. The two eldest sons served in the 115th Ohio Volunteer Infantry during the American Civil War and died in service within three weeks of each other, by sickness. In 1855 Almira Lahm died and Lahm remarried, to Henrietta Faber of Pittsburgh. Lahm and Henrietta had three daughters.

Born in Leitersburg, Maryland, he was of German descent, his parents having emigrated from Germany. Lahm completed preparatory studies and then taught school. He attended Washington College (now Washington & Jefferson College in Washington, Pennsylvania. He studied law with Oliver H. Smith in Indiana. Lahm was admitted to the Ohio bar in 1836 and moved to Canton, Ohio to open a practice. He intended to return to Leitersburg, but stopped in Canton, Ohio and was pleased with the place. He partnered with Andrew W. Loomis until Loomis left the state in 1841. He served as the master of chancery from 1837 to 1841 and prosecuting attorney of Stark County from 1837 to 1845. He served two terms as a member of the Ohio Senate in 1842. He was selected as a delegate to the Democratic National Convention in 1844 in Baltimore, Maryland.

Lahm was appointed as a brigadier general in the state's antebellum militia, and commanded the 2nd Brigade, 6th Division of Ohio during the Mexican War.

Congress 
He was an unsuccessful candidate for election in 1844 to the Twenty-ninth Congress. However, he was elected as a Democrat to the Thirtieth Congress and served from  March 4, 1847 – March 3, 1849. He lost election to Ohio's 18th congressional district in 1856. Lahm served as a delegate to the 1860 Democratic National Convention

Later career and death 
Retiring from politics, he engaged in agricultural pursuits and sheep raising.

He died in Canton on June 16, 1876, and was interred in West Lawn Cemetery.

References

 

1812 births
1876 deaths
Ohio lawyers
Democratic Party Ohio state senators
People from Washington County, Maryland
Washington & Jefferson College alumni
Politicians from Canton, Ohio
American people of the Mexican–American War
Burials at West Lawn Cemetery
County district attorneys in Ohio
American militia generals
American people of German descent
19th-century American politicians
Lawyers from Canton, Ohio
19th-century American lawyers
Democratic Party members of the United States House of Representatives from Ohio